The Hmar People's Convention (HPC) was established as a political party in 1986.  The group advocates for the rights of members of the Hmar people (estimated 1,12,535 members per a 1991 census), one of the smaller tribes of northeastern India.

The group was formed following the conclusion of peace between Indian central government and the Mizo National Front (MNF) on 30 June 1986, which did not take into account the Hmar wish for autonomy.  Their main demand is to create an autonomous region in the north and northeast of Mizoram.

Sources 
 Dena, Lal,In search of identity: Hmar of North-East India,New Delhi 2008,

References

National liberation movements
Political parties established in 1986
1986 establishments in Mizoram
Political parties in Mizoram